The chestnut-eared laughingthrush (Ianthocincla konkakinhensis) is a species of bird in the family Leiothrichidae. It is found in Vietnam and possibly Laos.

This species measures . This laughingthrush has boldly and irregularly barred black and white upperparts, a black-streaked grey forehead, chestnut ear-coverts,  and a white-tipped tail with a broad black sub-terminal band.

Endemic to Kon Tum Province, Vietnam, the only known site for this species is a small area in Kon Ka Kinh National Park (which is also the origin of the species' scientific name). Its natural habitat is subtropical or tropical moist montane forests. It is threatened by habitat loss.

The chestnut-eared laughingthrush was originally placed in the genus Garrulax but following the publication of a comprehensive molecular phylogenetic study in 2018, it was moved to the resurrected genus Ianthocincla.

References

Further reading

External links

 
 
 
 

Ianthocincla
Endemic birds of Vietnam
Birds described in 2001
Taxonomy articles created by Polbot
Taxobox binomials not recognized by IUCN